Proceedings is a 96-page monthly magazine published by the United States Naval Institute.  Launched in 1874, it is one of the oldest continuously published magazines in the United States. Proceedings covers topics concerning global security and includes articles from military professionals and civilian experts, historical essays, book reviews, full-color photography, and reader commentary. Roughly a third are written by active-duty personnel, a third by retired military, and a third by civilians. Proceedings also frequently carries feature articles by Secretaries of Defense, Secretaries of the Navy, Chairmen of the Joint Chiefs of Staff, and top leaders of the Navy, Marine Corps and Coast Guard.

Notable contributors
Over the decades many notable names have contributed articles to Proceedings either early in their careers or when they reached the upper echelons of leadership, and in many cases, both.

 Tom Clancy, best-selling author of techno-thrillers such as The Hunt for Red October
 George Dewey, only officer in U.S. history to attain the rank of Admiral of the Navy
 Ernest King, Chief of Naval Operations (CNO) during World War II
 Alfred Thayer Mahan, U.S. Navy flag officer, geostrategist and historian
 Chester W. Nimitz, Commander in Chief, Pacific Ocean Areas (CinCPOA), for U.S. and Allied air, land, and sea forces during World War II
 Theodore Roosevelt, 26th President of the United States
 James G. Stavridis, NATO's 16th Supreme Allied Commander Europe
 Yates Stirling, Jr., U.S. Navy flag officer, author, submarine pioneer and first commander of Naval Submarine Base New London and Submarine School

External links
 

1874 establishments in Maryland
Monthly magazines published in the United States
English-language magazines
Magazines established in 1874
Magazines published in Maryland
Maritime magazines
Military magazines published in the United States
United States Naval Academy
United States Naval Institute